The Movement for France (MPF) was a conservative, soft Eurosceptic and Gaullist French political party, founded on 20 November 1994, with a marked regional stronghold in the Vendée. It was led by Philippe de Villiers, once communications minister under Jacques Chirac.

The party was considered Eurosceptic, though not to the extent of seeking withdrawal from the European Union. In this way it contrasts with some mainstream Eurosceptic parties such as the UK Independence Party (UKIP). The MPF resists increases in European integration and campaigned successfully for a "no" vote in the French referendum of 2005 on the proposed European Constitution.

It was also strongly opposed to the possible accession of Turkey to the European Union and to what it sees as the Islamisation of France.

The party was a member of President Nicolas Sarkozy's presidential majority, which gathers allies of the ruling party Union for a Popular Movement (UMP).

History

Founded in 1994, the party nominated Philippe de Villiers as candidate in the 1995 presidential election. He obtained over a million votes and 4.74% of the popular vote, but failed to pass 5%.

In the 1997 legislative election, the MPF joined forces with the National Centre of Independents and Peasants as La Droite Indépendante (LDI). Philippe de Villiers was re-elected, as was one of his allies, who nonetheless left the party soon thereafter.

It contested the 1999 European Parliamentary elections in alliance with the Rassemblement pour la France (RPF) of Charles Pasqua, the combination winning 13 seats, surpassing Nicolas Sarkozy's Rassemblement pour la République (RPR) list. The MPF formed an alliance with the RPF, but Villiers fell out with Pasqua the following year. Standing by itself in the 2004 European elections, the MPF obtained 7.6% of the popular vote and returned three Members of the European Parliament (MEPs). The party was a member of the Independence and Democracy group in the European Parliament.

Villiers declared his candidacy for the 2007 presidential election and appointed a secretary-general, Guillaume Peltier, then ranked second in the party. He ranked sixth out of twelve candidates, obtaining 2.23% (818,407 votes), down almost 2% from his previous candidacy in 1995. His best scores came in Pays de la Loire with 4.99% and Poitou-Charentes with 3.58%. Unlike in 1995, he failed to win in his department of Vendée, where he obtained 11.28% (over 20% in 1995).

In the 2007 legislative election, MPF candidates ran nationwide, but only one candidate was elected – Véronique Besse in Vendée's 4th constituency by the first round. Former MPF member Joël Sarlot was also elected by the first round in the Vendée's 5th constituency. Sarlot subsequently lent support to the victorious Union for a Popular Movement (UMP) in the National Assembly. Sarlot's election was invalidated in 2007 and Dominique Souchet, a Villierist won the ensuing by-election easily. Other candidates, mostly in the south of France obtained important scores. Jacques Bompard, in the 4th constituency of Vaucluse won over 20%.

In the 2009 European Parliament election, the party ran with Hunting, Fishing, Nature, Tradition under the umbrella of the Libertas political movement led by Irish businessman Declan Ganley. It won 4.8% and only Philippe de Villiers was re-elected: Patrick Louis was defeated. The MPF was the only Libertas affiliated party throughout the whole of the European Union to elect MEPs in 2009. The party was member of the Europe of Freedom and Democracy (EFD) group during the 7th European Parliament.

In August 2009, Philippe de Villiers announced that the MPF would join the Liaison Committee for the Presidential Majority, which co-ordinates the member parties of the majority supporting the policies of President Nicolas Sarkozy.

The party was dissolved in 2018.

Popular support and electoral record

The MPF had little electoral clout and most of its support was concentrated in Philippe de Villiers' department of Vendée, his electoral stronghold. While most of his support drew on his status as a favourite son, Vendée is also a strongly Traditionalist Catholic department which maintains a sense of pride in the monarchist counter-revolution and the Chouans during the French Revolution. In the 2009 European election, Villiers' list won the department with 32.96% while polling only 4.8% nationally. In the 2004 European election the MPF won 38.63% and it won 31.9% in the 1999 elections and 34.75% in 1994. However, the MPF is weaker in the department in national elections – such as presidential votes. Philippe de Villiers, who had won 22.02% in his department in the 1995 presidential election (he also got first place) came in fourth place with 11.28% in the 2007 presidential election. His electoral base in the department is his constituency – Vendée's 4th constituency – in which he consistently does better than in the department as a whole.

His influence waned, however: through considered to be pro-EU in general, the department voted against the Maastricht Treaty in 1992 due to Villiers' influence, but it voted for the European Constitution in 2005. It was the only department to switch between a NO vote in 1992 and a YES vote in 2005.

The MPF was also strong in other departments, mostly those neighboring Vendée. In 2009, for example, Villiers' list won 14.26% in the Deux-Sèvres, a department which is also strongly Catholic. It also won 12.36% in Charente-Maritime, 10.39% in Maine-et-Loire, 9.79% in Charente, 9.29% in Vienne and 8.56% in Loire-Atlantique. Due to Jacques Bompard, it also polled 6.40% in the southeastern Vaucluse department.

Presidential

Legislative

European Parliament

Media opinion
The MPF and Villers, mostly due to their views on Islam and Muslim immigration, have been labeled in world news media such as CNN, Der Spiegel, The Wall Street Journal, The Boston Globe, and The San Francisco Chronicle as "far right".

Ideology

The MPF is a souverainist party which supports the national independence of France within a Europe "of peoples and co-operation". Unlike the United Kingdom Independence Party, it does not support France's withdrawal from the EU but rather a massive overhaul of it. The MPF is a strong critic of what it sees as excessive bureaucracy and technocracy in the EU. Its various proposals include:

European Union

 Restore the rule of national law over EU law.
 Ceasing negotiations over the accession of Turkey to the European Union, and begin a process of privileged partnership with Turkey and other Mediterranean countries.
 Allow the countries of Europe to form their own, independent foreign policies.
 Follow a policy of respect of national borders and control of immigration.
 Put the national Parliaments in the middle of European construction and giving them veto power on the vital interests of the people which they represent.
 Put the European Union and the euro at the service of the growth and employment.
 Found a European preference for industry and the services, as for agriculture.
 Opposition to the Lisbon Treaty and halting the ratification process.
 Draft a "fundamental treaty" of the European Union based on a free association of independent nations and peoples.

Economy
 Establishing a "European protectionism" with tariffs on external imports. Within France, it is more neoliberal in supporting lower taxes to encourage the growth of industries within France.
 End the 35-hour workweek
 Liberalization of the fixed retirement age (60)
 Maximum rate of taxation at 38%
 Repealing the solidarity tax on wealth (ISF)

Internal issues
 Referendum on the re-establishment of the death penalty
 Forbid the wearing of the hijab in public.
 Establishing a moratorium on constructing mosques in France.
 Abolition of the French Council of the Muslim Faith (CFCM)
 Opposition to same-sex marriage: constitutional amendment establishing marriage as between a man and a woman
 The party supports alternatives to abortion though it does not support forbidding it

Elected officials

 Deputies: Véronique Besse, Dominique Souchet (Non-Inscrits)
 Senators: Bruno Retailleau, Philippe Darniche (RASNAG)
 MEPs: Philippe de Villiers (EFD)

The MPF currently controls one general council, that of Vendée, where Villiers serves as President of the General Council. It has 10 general councillors in Vendée in addition to one in the Morbihan (Quiberon), one in the Meuse (Charny-sur-Meuse) and two in the Vaucluse (Orange). It claims 5 regional councillors, most of which were elected on FN lists in 2004.

See also
List of political parties in France
Politics of France
Debout La France (another social conservative radical right-wing political party of France)

References

External links
Official Movement for France web site
Official web site of the MPF with the European Parliament
Sit Web of the JPF
Article of the Time concerning the book subversive “mosques of Roissy”

Libertas.eu
Political parties established in 1994
Right-wing parties in France
Conservative parties in France
Right-wing populism in France
Gaullist parties
1994 establishments in France